Solanum lichtensteinii is a species of plant in the family Solanaceae. The IUCN lists the species as least concern.

The species is named after Hinrich Lichtenstein. The species is andromonecious.

It can occur in arid areas and overgrazed areas. It can be found in Botswana, Mozambique, Namibia, Tanzania, Zambia, Democratic Republic of the Congo, and Zimbabwe.

References 

lichtensteinii
Flora of Botswana
Flora of Mozambique
Flora of Namibia
Flora of Tanzania
Flora of Zambia
Flora of the Democratic Republic of the Congo
Flora of Zimbabwe